Plekocheilus euryomphalus is a species of air-breathing land snail, a terrestrial pulmonate gastropod mollusc in the family Amphibulimidae.

Distribution 
This species occurs in:
 El Hatillo Municipality, Miranda, Venezuela

References

External links 

 http://www.gbif.net/species/browse/resource/1104/taxon/6500679/

Amphibulimidae
Gastropods described in 1844